Bon Air Baptist Church (BABC) is a dynamic, multisite congregation with multiple campuses in Chesterfield County.

Locations 
Bon Air Baptist Church currently has two campuses:
 The Buford Road Campus is located in the National Historic District of Bon Air, VA. 
 The James River Campus is located just west of 288 and 711 in Midlothian, VA.

Mission 
Proclaiming the Grace of God...Growing Followers of Christ

Vision 
"A place to belong... A place to become."

Culture 
Emotionally Healthy Spirituality

Beliefs 
Bon Air Baptist Church affirms the 1963 Baptist Faith and Message statement.

History 
The church was started by Woodland Heights Baptist Church.

References

External links
www.bonairbaptist.org Bon Air Baptist Official Website 
www.whbcva.org Woodland Heights Baptist Church

Baptist churches in Virginia
Churches in Richmond, Virginia